Operation Bigamy a.k.a. Operation Snowdrop was a raid during the Second World War by the Special Air Service in September 1942 under the command of Lieutenant Colonel David Stirling and supported by the Long Range Desert Group. The plan was to destroy the harbour and storage facilities at Benghazi and raid the airfield at Benina in Libya in coordination with the RAF. The raid was part of a deception plan for Operation Agreement, the much larger raid on Tobruk.

The plan involved a "gruelling journey around the southern edge of the  Great Sand Sea" but ended in failure. The raiding force was discovered at a road block by an Italian reconnaissance unit and Stirling decided to withdraw to Kufra. During the withdrawal, the Luftwaffe picked off nearly 70 of the vehicles on the barren terrain.  The survivors were reformed as the 1st Special Air Service regiment.

The frequently used, albeit inaccurate, name Operation Snowdrop stems from early editions of William Boyd Kennedy Shaws' book Long Range Desert Group. At the time, War Office security policy would not permit Shaw to use real operational code names.

In September 1967 Len Deighton wrote an article in The Sunday Times Magazine about Operation Snowdrop. The following year Stirling was awarded "substantial damages" in a libel action about the article. The passage complained of states "Stirling himself had insisted upon talking about the raid at two social gatherings at the British Embassy in Cairo although warned not to do so". Stirling made the point that Winston Churchill had been at both gatherings and the issue was raised in a private discussion with the Prime Minister.

References

1942 in Libya
Conflicts in 1942
Special Air Service
World War II British Commando raids
Land battles of World War II involving the United Kingdom
Battles and operations of World War II involving Italy
Battles and operations of World War II involving Germany
September 1942 events